Dawid Rogalski (born 20 September 1996) is a Polish professional footballer who plays as a forward for Marlow.

Career
Rogalski was born in Poland but moved to England at the age of 5. He played for various non-league sides before joining the academy of Maidenhead United. In January 2015, he made his only competitive senior appearance for Maidenhead United, coming on as a substitute in a National League South match against Bath City. In January 2017, he spent time on loan with Middlesex County League side PFC Victoria London. In July 2017, he returned to Poland to join Tychy, signing a two-year contract. The following month he made his debut, playing the first half in a Polish Cup match against KS Cracovia. He spent the following season on loan at II liga side Gryf Wejherowo. In July 2019, he joined Katowice on a one-year contract. In August 2020, he moved up a division, signing a one-year contract with Resovia Rzeszów. He left them by mutual consent on 21 January 2021. Later in the year he returned to England and joined Isthmian League club Chalfont St Peter. Rogalski joined Marlow for the 2022-23 season.

References

External links

Profile at Polish Football Association
Marlow stats at FWP

1996 births
Living people
Polish footballers
English footballers
English people of Polish descent
Association football forwards
People from Szczytno
Wealdstone F.C. players
Harefield United F.C. players
Maidenhead United F.C. players
PFC Victoria London players
GKS Tychy players
Gryf Wejherowo players
GKS Katowice players
Resovia (football) players
Chalfont St Peter A.F.C. players
Marlow F.C. players
National League (English football) players
Isthmian League players
II liga players
I liga players